Bijendra Singh (born 25 December 1956) is an Indian politician. He stood for the 2004 Lok Sabha elections on the Indian National Congress ticket and had been a Member of Parliament from Aligarh.
He is the resident of village Dhonda near [Iglas] Tehsil. He had also been five times MLA from Iglas, Aligarh.

External links
 Official biography from Parliament of India records

1956 births
Living people
People from Uttar Pradesh
People from Aligarh district
India MPs 2004–2009
Members of the Uttar Pradesh Legislative Assembly
Lok Sabha members from Uttar Pradesh
United Progressive Alliance candidates in the 2014 Indian general election
Indian National Congress politicians from Uttar Pradesh